Gladstone is an electoral district of the Legislative Assembly in the Australian state of Queensland.

The seat was created as a reconfigured version of Port Curtis for the 1992 election. It consists of the city of Gladstone and some of the towns of the former Shire of Calliope. This includes the localities of Ambrose, Benaraby, Boyne Island, Builyan, Mount Larcom, Tannum Sands and Ubobo. The town of Calliope is now part of the Callide electoral district.

The current member is Labor MP Glenn Butcher. Butcher won the seat following the retirement of long-serving independent Liz Cunningham, who won the seat on National Party preferences after defeating then Labor MP Neil Bennett at the 1995 election. Cunningham was a well-known local figure, having previously been Mayor of the Shire of Calliope prior to entering State politics. Her 1995 victory made her the first non-Labor member for Gladstone and its predecessors since 1932, and only the second since 1915.

Even though Cunningham had held the seat without much difficulty, Gladstone had almost always been a safe Labor seat in calculations of "traditional" two-party matchups–i. e., Labor vs. National before 2009, and Labor vs. LNP since 2009.  This is due almost entirely to the presence of the city of Gladstone, a Labor stronghold for the better part of a century.  Proving this, Labor would have held the seat on a margin of 11 percent during its meltdown of 2012.  Thus, it was not considered an upset when Butcher, who had been Cunningham's Labor opponent in 2012, easily reclaimed the seat for Labor at the 2015 election. Underlining Labor's strength in the seat, Butcher won an outright majority on the first count while pushing the LNP into third place.

Labor consolidated its hold on the seat in 2017, with Butcher picking up a healthy swing of 10.7 percent and again pushing the LNP into third place. He was reelected in 2020 with a two-party vote of 73.5 percent, making Gladstone the third-safest Labor seat in the state and the safest outside Brisbane.

Members for Gladstone

Election results

References

External links
 

Electoral districts of Queensland
Gladstone Region
1992 establishments in Australia